Nene may refer to:

People
Nene (name), list of people with this name

 Kōdai-in, formerly known as Nene (1546–1624), principal samurai wife of Toyotomi Hideyoshi
 Nené (footballer, 1942-2016), nickname of Brazilian footballer Claudio Olinto de Carvalho
 Nené (footballer, born 1949), nickname of Portuguese footballer Tamagnini Manuel Gomes Baptista
 Nenê (footballer, born 1981), nickname of Brazilian footballer Anderson Luiz de Carvalho
 Nenê (footballer, born 1983), nickname of Brazilian footballer Ânderson Miguel da Silva
 Nené (footballer, born 1996), nickname of Mozambican footballer Feliciano João Jone
 Nenê (born 1982), legally changed name of Brazilian basketball player Maybyner Rodney Hilário
 Nené (born 1942), nickname of Brazilian footballer Claudio Olinto de Carvalho 
 Nenê (born 1983), nickname of Brazilian futsal player João Carlos Gonçalves Filho
 Nenê (born 1976), nickname of Brazilian women's footballer Elissandra Regina Cavalcanti
 Néné (1834–1890), nickname of Duchess Helene in Bavaria
 El Nene (born 1960), stage name of Cuban singer Pedro Lugo
 Uyinene Mrwetyana (2000-2019), nickname, Murder was a South African student.

Other uses
 Nêne, 1920 novel by Ernest Pérochon
 Nenè, 1977 Italian movie
 River Nene, a river in England
 Rolls-Royce Nene, a jet engine, named after the river
 HMCS Nene (K270), a 1942 River-class Frigate in World War II
 Nene (bird), Hawaiian goose Branta sandvicensis, Hawaiian state bird
 Nene (seed), Ormosia coccinea, called nene in Costa Rica
 Nene (trail), a Seminole Indian word meaning "street"
 Nebraska Northeastern Railway (reporting mark NENE), a shortline railroad that began operations on July 23, 1996, in northeastern Nebraska

See also
 Nae Nae, a hip-hop dance